Calgary-Edgemont is a provincial electoral district in Alberta, Canada. The district is one of 87 districts mandated to return a single member (MLA) to the Legislative Assembly of Alberta using the first past the post method of voting. It was contested for the first time in the 2019 Alberta election.

Geography
The district is located in northwestern Calgary, containing the neighbourhoods of Dalhousie, Edgemont, Ranchlands, Hawkwood, and Hamptons.

History

The district was created in 2017 when the Electoral Boundaries Commission recommended renaming Calgary-Hawkwood and shifting its boundaries eastward into Calgary-Foothills and Calgary-Varsity, losing the Silver Springs, Citadel and Arbour Lake neighbourhoods while gaining Dalhousie, Edgemont, and Hamptons. The riding is one of the more populous districts created in this redistribution, resulting from the Commission's decision not to divide any of its communities.

Electoral results

2019 general election

References

Alberta provincial electoral districts
Politics of Calgary